Pangolin, sometimes known as a scaly anteater, is a mammal of the order Pholidota -one extant family, Manidae; more specifically:
 Manidae (pangolins)
 Maninae (subfamily: Asiatic pangolins) 
 Manis (Asiatic pangolins)
 Manis crassicaudata (Indian pangolin)
 Manis pentadactyla (Chinese pangolin)
 Paramanis 
 Manis javanica (Sunda pangolin)
 Manis culionensis (Philippine pangolin)
 †Manis palaeojavanica 
 Phatagininae (small African pangolins)
 Phataginus (African tree pangolins)
 Phataginus tetradactyla (Long-tailed pangolin)
 Phataginus tricuspis (Tree pangolin)
 Subfamily: Smutsiinae (large African pangolins)
 Smutsia (African ground pangolins)
 Smutsia gigantea (Giant pangolin)
 Smutsia temmincki (Ground pangolin)

Science, and technology, and mathematics

Software
 The name was also used for a release of the Ubuntu operating system, v12.04, Ubuntu 12.04 LTS (Precise Pangolin)
 Phylogenetic Assignment of Named Global Outbreak Lineages (PANGOLIN)